Église Saint-Michel de Reichshoffen  is a church in Reichshoffen, Bas-Rhin, Alsace, France. Built in 1772, it became a registered Monument historique in 1921.

References

Reichshoffen
Reichshoffen
Reichshoffen
18th-century Roman Catholic church buildings in France